Alameda is a town in south-eastern Saskatchewan, Canada, approximately 50 km east of Estevan. A translation of Alameda from Spanish is "Poplar Grove" or "Tree Lined Avenue". One popular story is that the town was named for Alameda, California although there is no written documentation to support this. Alameda had a population of 369 in the Canada Census of 2016.

Alameda is situated in the south-east corner of Saskatchewan. The closest larger centres to Alameda are Estevan, Weyburn, Regina, and Minot, North Dakota. Alameda sits in an area that is abundant with grain, oil, and water.

Demographics 

Amenities
Alameda offers the following community facilities: a community ice rink (skating, curling), Heritage museum, and the Alameda Merry Makers Senior Centre.

Alameda offered a wide range of services for its residents, which included a full-service grocery and meat store, a restaurant, a banking institution, full-service campground as well as many others.  As with other small communities in Saskatchewan, many of the businesses are closing and/or closed and the residents drive to other communities for services that once were in their community.

Alameda is famous for being the home of the Grant Devine Dam (formerly the Alameda Dam) which has turned into a full-service recreational area.  The Grant Devine Dam is the home of the Alameda Fishing Derby which takes place the 3rd weekend of June each year. It is also the home of Moose Creek Regional Park and 9-hole golf course.

Alameda hosts various events throughout the year including the Alameda Agricultural Society fair and 4-H show and sale and the Alameda Flower Show.

Gallery

Notable people
 George Ramsay Cook – OC, FRSC, Canadian historian and general editor of the Dictionary of Canadian Biography.
 John James Harrop – Politician
 Trent Whitfield, drafted 100th overall in the 1996 NHL Draft by the Boston Bruins currently plays for HC Bolzano in the Austrian Hockey League (EBEL), is from Alameda.

See also
 List of communities in Saskatchewan
 List of towns in Saskatchewan
 List of Canadian tornadoes and tornado outbreaks

References

External links

Towns in Saskatchewan
Division No. 1, Saskatchewan